Edwin Josue Correa (born April 29, 1966, in Hato Rey, Puerto Rico) is a retired professional baseball player who played three seasons for the Chicago White Sox and Texas Rangers of Major League Baseball. As a rookie in 1986 Correa lead all rookies with 189 strikeouts and was part of the "Kiddie Corps" of Rangers rookies that helped the team to a surprising 2nd-place finish with a record of 87–75. At the age of 20, Correa was one of the youngest players in Major League Baseball at the time.

Correa was a practicing Seventh-day Adventist and as such would not pitch in any game from sundown Friday till sundown Saturday. The Rangers were able to work around this disruption to their five-man pitching staff due to Charlie Hough's ability to pitch often on short rest. In 1987 Correa injured his arm and never pitched in the majors again.

Correa managed the Trujillo Alto, Puerto Rico PONY Baseball team that won the 2007 World Series in Washington, Pennsylvania.  His team played against seven other teams to win the title.

Correa founded the Puerto Rico Baseball Academy and High School, a secondary school that also offers intensive baseball training in addition to its academic program.

See also

 List of Major League Baseball players from Puerto Rico

References

1966 births
Living people
Allentown Ambassadors players
Appleton Foxes players
Chicago White Sox players
Glens Falls White Sox players
Gulf Coast Rangers players
Gulf Coast White Sox players
Major League Baseball pitchers
Major League Baseball players from Puerto Rico
Mexican League baseball pitchers
Puerto Rican expatriate baseball players in Mexico
Puerto Rican Seventh-day Adventists
San Antonio Missions players
Saraperos de Saltillo players
Texas Rangers players
Vero Beach Dodgers players